The 1910–11 Army Cadets men's ice hockey season was the 8th season of play for the program.

Season
Former team captain Lt. Leroy Bartlett served as coach for the team. In his first game behind the bench the Cadets earned their first win in almost three years. The succeeding three games were all close affairs but Army could not summon enough offense to overcome their opponents and the team finished the season on a three game losing streak.

Roster

Standings

Schedule and results

|-
!colspan=12 style=";" | Regular Season

References

Army Black Knights men's ice hockey seasons
Army
Army
Army
Army